The men's high jump event at the 1963 Summer Universiade was held at the Estádio Olímpico Monumental in Porto Alegre on 8 September 1963.

Results

References

Athletics at the 1963 Summer Universiade
1963